Stigmella atrata is a moth of the family Nepticulidae. It is found in New Zealand.

The length of the forewings is about 4 mm. Adults have been recorded in January, February, November and December. There is probably one generation per year.

The larvae feed on Brachyglottis reinoldii. They mine the leaves of their host plant. The mine gives the appearance of a chain of empty cells, as though larva eats contents and leaves walls more or less intact. The frass is visible only in the last part of the gallery. Larva have been recorded in April, May, July and September. They are about 4 mm long and pale brown. The cocoon is brown and spun among debris on the ground.

References

Nepticulidae
Moths of New Zealand
Endemic fauna of New Zealand
Moths described in 1989
Endemic moths of New Zealand